The École Centrale de Marseille is a leading graduate school of engineering (or Grande école of engineering) located in Marseille, the second largest city in France. The École Centrale de Marseille was created in 2006 by the merging of different previous institutions and has its origins from the École d'ingénieurs de Marseille founded in 1890. It is one of the Centrale Graduate Schools (Paris, Lyon, Lille, Nantes, Marseille and Beijing) and a member of the TIME (Top Industrial Managers for Europe) network.

Academic profile 
The Ecole Centrale de Marseille is a multidisciplinary school, where the great majority of the students have endured two or three years of intensive maths and physics training (known as prepa).
The students do not have any particular major before the last year (Master's level), during which they have to choose among a few electives:
 Mechanical engineering
 Chemical engineering
 Physics, optics and electrical engineering
 Business Administration and Finance
 Mathematics and computer science

The students can also complete their last year in one of the other Centrale Graduate Schools or be part of an exchange program.

There are three-years PhD programs available in all the aforementioned domains of research (the students are required to have completed a Master's program).

Exchange programs 
Being a part of the TIME (Top Industrial Managers for Europe) network, the school has exchange program with many universities across the world, among them Technical University of Munich (Germany), Cranfield University (UK), Royal Institute of Technology (Sweden), Penn State (USA), University of São Paulo (Brazil), University of Waterloo (Canada), Keio University (Japan) or University of Chile (Chile).

Research 
Eight research laboratories are under the joint leadership of Ecole Centrale Marseille and Aix-Marseille University :
 Laboratory for Mechanics and Acoustics (LMA - Laboratoire de Mécanique et d'Acoustique)
 Institut Fresnel (Optics, Photonics and Signal Processing)
 Institute of Research on Non Equilibrium Phenomena (IRPHE - Institut de Recherche sur les Phénomènes Hors Équilibre)
 Institute of Molecular Sciences of Marseille (iSm2 - Institut des sciences moléculaires de Marseille)
 Mechanics, Modelling and Clean Processes (M2P2 - Mécanique Modélisation et Procédés Propres)
 Research Group in Quantitative Economics of Aix-Marseille (GREQAM - Groupe de Recherche en Économie Quantitative)
 Laboratory of Analysis, Topology, and Probability (LATP - Laboratoire d’Analyse, Topologie, Probabilités)
 Laboratory of Fundamental Computer Science (LIF - Laboratoire d’Informatique Fondamentale)

Rankings 
Ecole Centrale de Marseille is ranked among the top 20 French Grandes Ecoles, though it doesn't appear in international rankings due to its very limited number of students (250 students for the class of 2016).

Alumni 
The alumni network is made of over 14,000 graduates.

Notable alumni 
 Simon Méry, co-founder in 1899 of the French motor company Turcat-Méry
 Malika Haimeur (1956–), awarded the Irène Joliot-Curie Prize for Women & Business in 2009
 Alain Dutheil (1969), former COO at STMicroelectronics, former CEO at ST-Ericsson
 François Guibert (1978), CEO at STMicroelectronics Asia-Pacific

References

External links 
 

Marseille
Educational institutions established in 1890
1890 establishments in France